Somerset County Cricket Club was formed in 1875 and became a first-class county in 1882. They played their first Twenty20 match in the 2003 Twenty20 Cup against Warwickshire. Somerset have reached the domestic Twenty20 competition final on five occasions: the club won the 2005 Twenty20 Cup, and were runners-up in three consecutive seasons: 2009, 2010 and 2011. Their performances in the competition have resulted in their qualification for the 2009 and 2011 Champions League Twenty20 competitions, and an invitation to participate in the 2010–11 Caribbean Twenty20. In total, 100 players have appeared in Twenty20 cricket for Somerset, of whom James Hildreth has played the most matches: 206 since his debut in 2004.

Hildreth is Somerset's leading run-scorer in Twenty20 cricket, aggregating 3,906 runs. He is also one of only nine batsmen to have scored a century for Somerset in the format, along with Tom Abell, Babar Azam, Tom Banton, Chris Gayle, Johann Myburgh, Graeme Smith, Marcus Trescothick and Cameron White. Gayle's score of 151 not out, scored in 2015 against Kent is the highest score by a Somerset batsman, and Gayle also has the county's best batting average: 84.16. Among the bowlers, Max Waller has taken more wickets than any other bowler, claiming 139, two more than Alfonso Thomas. The best bowling average is Jack Leach's 12.00. Arul Suppiah has the best bowling figures in an innings: he claimed six wickets against Glamorgan in a 2011 match, while only conceding five runs. Suppiah's figures in that match were the best by any bowler in Twenty20 cricket at the time. Craig Kieswetter has taken the most catches as wicket-keeper for Somerset, with 40, and has made the highest number of stumpings: 14. Max Waller has claimed the highest number of catches among fielders, taking 86.

Players are initially listed in order of appearance; where players made their debut in the same match, they are initially listed by batting order.

Key

List of players

References

Twenty20
Somerset